Paranomus sceptrum-gustavianus, the King Gustav's sceptre, is a flowering shrub that belongs to the genus Paranomus and forms part of the fynbos. The plant is native to the Western Cape, South Africa.

Description
The lower leaves of the shrub are finely divided and the upper one is spoon-shaped or diamond-shaped. The shrub blooms from July to March. Fire destroys the plant but the seeds survive. The plant is bisexual and pollination takes place through the action of insects. The fruit ripens two months after the plant has flowered and the seeds fall to the ground where they are spread by ants.

Distribution and habitat
The plant occurs from the Hottentots Holland Mountains to the western Langeberg as well as the Elim plains.

Gallery

References

sceptrum-gustavianus